Nimrod Greenwood (28 October 1929 – 9 September 2016) was an Australian rower who competed in the 1952 Summer Olympics.

He was schooled at Sydney Boys High School, graduating in 1946. His senior rowing was done at the Leichhardt Rowing Club in Sydney.

In 1952 he rowed in the three seat of the Australian boat which won the bronze medal in the eights event at the Helsinki Olympics. Edward Pain and David Anderson who were also seated in that VIII had also attended Sydney High.

References

External links
 profile

1929 births
2016 deaths
Australian male rowers
Olympic rowers of Australia
Rowers at the 1952 Summer Olympics
Olympic bronze medalists for Australia
Olympic medalists in rowing
Medalists at the 1952 Summer Olympics
20th-century Australian people